Hoarding is a behavior where people or animals accumulate food or other items.

Animal behavior

Hoarding and caching are common in many bird species as well as in rodents. Most animal caches are of food.  However, some birds will also stingily collect other items, especially if the birds are pets. Magpies are infamous for hoarding items such as money and jewelry. (Contrary to popular belief, research suggests magpies are no more attracted to shiny things than other kinds of items.) One theory suggests that human hoarding may be related to animal hoarding behavior, but substantial evidence is lacking.

Human hoarding

Civil unrest or threat of natural disaster may lead people to hoard foodstuffs, water, gasoline and other essentials that they believe will soon be in short supply. Survivalists, also known as preppers, often stockpile large supplies of these items in anticipation of a large-scale disaster event.

Other items commonly hoarded include coins considered to have an intrinsic value, such as those minted in silver, or gold, collectibles, jewellery, precious metals and other luxuries.

Anxiety  and hoarding

Individuals who meet diagnostic criteria for hoarding disorder experience feelings of anxiety or discomfort about discarding possessions they do not need. This discomfort arises from an emotional attachment to possessions and a strong belief that their possessions will be needed in the future. Possessions will take on a sentimental value that outweighs their functional value. This is no different from someone without hoarding disorder; the difference lies in the strength of this sentimental value and in how many items take on a sentimental value. When discarding items, hoarders may feel like they are throwing away a part of themselves.

In severe cases, a house may become a fire hazard (due to blocked exits and stacked papers) or a health hazard (due to vermin infestation, excreta and detritus from excessive pets, hoarded food and garbage or the risk of stacks of items collapsing on the occupants and blocking exit routes). Hoarding affects more than just the person who has the strong attachment to possessions, as other people living in the home and neighbours can be affected by the clutter. Individuals with hoarding disorder have a quality of life as poor as those diagnosed with schizophrenia. The disorder increases family strain, work impairment, and the risk of serious medical conditions.

According to the Diagnostic and Statistical Manual of Mental Disorders, Fifth Edition, the symptoms for hoarding disorder include:
A. Persistent difficulty discarding or parting with possessions, regardless of their actual value.
B. This difficulty is due to a perceived need to save the items and to distress associated with discarding them.
C. The difficulty discarding possessions results in the accumulation of possessions that congest and clutter active living areas and substantially compromises their intended use. If living areas are uncluttered, it is only because of the interventions of third parties (e.g., family members, cleaners, authorities).
D. The hoarding causes clinically significant distress or impairment in social, occupational, or other important areas of functioning (including maintaining a safe environment for self and others).
E. The hoarding is not attributable to another medical condition (e.g., brain injury, cerebrovascular disease, Prader-Willi syndrome).
F. The hoarding is not better explained by the symptoms of other mental disorders (e.g., obsessions in obsessive-compulsive disorder, decreased energy in major depressive disorder, delusions in schizophrenia or another psychotic disorder, cognitive deficits in major neurocognitive disorder, restricted interests in autism spectrum disorder).

Treatment 
There are no medications currently approved by the Food and Drug Administration for treating the symptoms of hoarding. Some medications, such as selective serotonin reuptake inhibitors (SSRIs) and serotonin/norepinephrine reuptake inhibitors (SNRIs), can be used off-label for individuals diagnosed with hoarding disorder.

The primary treatment for hoarding disorder is individual psychotherapy. In particular, cognitive behavior therapy is regarded as the gold standard for treating the disorder.

See also 

 Collecting
 Collyer brothers, rich eccentrics who were noted for compulsive hoarding
 Compulsive hoarding
 Digital hoarding
 Hoard (archaeological)
 Hoarding (economics)
 Panic buying
 Plyushkin, fictional Russian hoarder
 Psychology of collecting

References

Further reading

External links
 Photo guide for rating clutter from the International OCD Foundation
 US National Hoarding Resources listed by state

Collecting
Compulsive hoarding
Consumer behaviour
Scarcity
Home economics